Lee Hang-na is a South Korean actress, model and director, professor. She is known for her roles in dramas such as Vincenzo, Train, and Black Dog: Being A Teacher. She has also appeared in movies like Svaha: The Sixth Finger, Time to Hunt, and Golden Slumber.

Filmography

Television series

Film

Theater

Books
 Breathing and sound training for voice acting

Awards and nominations
 2000 The 36th Dong-A Theater Awards Acting Awards
 2001 Korea Theater Association's Best 5 Best Acting Awards

References

External links
 
 

1969 births
Living people
21st-century South Korean actresses
South Korean female models
South Korean television actresses
South Korean film actresses